Suurküla  is a village in Põlva Parish, Põlva County, in southeastern Estonia.

Ridali Airfield (ICAO: EERI) is located in Suurküla.

References

 

Villages in Põlva County